Andrey Rublev defeated Lloyd Harris in the final, 6–3, 6–0, to win the men's singles tennis title at the 2020 Adelaide International. This was the first edition of the event.

Seeds

Draw

Finals

Top half

Bottom half

Qualifying

Seeds

Qualifiers

Lucky losers

Qualifying draw

First qualifier

Second qualifier

Third qualifier

Fourth qualifier

References

External links
 Main draw
 Qualifying draw

Adelaide International
2020 Men's Singles
Adele
January 2020 sports events in Australia